Overthorpe is a village and civil parish in West Northamptonshire, about  east of Banbury in Oxfordshire and  southeast of junction 11 of the M40 motorway. Overthorpe is in the east of nshire, and its western boundary forms part of the county boundary with Oxfordshire. It is part of the informal district of Banburyshire.

The 2001 Census recorded the parish's population as 242, reducing slightly to 235 at the 2241 Census.

History
The Manor House is 17th-century, with a Tudor Revival rear extension that was added about 1930. The village has at least three other 17th-century houses and a 17th- or 18th-century barn.

An open field system of farming prevailed in Overthorpe until the 18th century. Traces of ridge and furrow survive north of the village. Overthorpe used to be part of the parish of Middleton Cheney, but its land tenure was linked with that of Warkworth. Parliament passed a single Inclosure Act for both Overthorpe and Warkworth in 1764.

Church and chapel
There is no church in Overthorpe. It is in the Church of England parish of St Mary, Warkworth, whose 14th-century church is midway between the two villages.

Overthorpe had a nonconformist chapel, but it is now a private house.

Amenities

The Jurassic Way long-distance footpath passes through the village.

References

Sources

External links

Civil parishes in Northamptonshire
Villages in Northamptonshire
West Northamptonshire District